Sparrow Hills, formerly known as Lenin Hills between 1935 and 1999, is a hill on the right bank of the Moskva River and one of the highest points in Moscow, reaching a height of  above the river level.

The Luzhniki Stadium (formerly the Lenin Stadium), where the opening and closing ceremonies for the 1980 Summer Olympics took place, is right below, across the Moskva River. Next to it is the Novodevichy Convent, with its Naryshkin Baroque towers.

Not far from the observation platform is the Luzhniki Metro Bridge. The two-level Metro-Bridge traverses the river to link Komsomolsky Prospekt with Vernadsky Prospekt. It serves two urban transport systems: motor vehicles and the Moscow Metro subway. The glass-walled subway station Vorobyovy Gory is at the lower level of the bridge.

The hills, immortalized by many Russian poets and writers, have been named after the village Vorobyovo, which was acquired by Grand Duchess Sophia Vitovtovna, Vitovt's only daughter, from the boyars Vorobyovs in 1453. Alexander I of Russia wished to build the Cathedral of Christ the Saviour there; his successor had construction works suspended and the cathedral eventually was erected near the Kremlin.

The main landmarks of the hills are the Moscow State University (at one time the tallest building in Europe) and the Trinity Church.

Notes

Literature

 Собрание государственных грамот и договоров, хранящихся в коллегии иностранных дел. ч. 1 с. 192. Москва, в типографии Н. С. Всеволожского, 1813.
 Тихомиров М. Н. Древняя Москва (XII—XV вв.) : Моск. гос. ун-т им. М. В. Ломоносова М. : Изд-во МГУ, 1947.
 Тихомиров М. Н. Труды по истории Москвы. Москва, Издательство: Языки славянской культуры, 2003 — .

External links 

Satellite picture by Google maps
photographs and article by Ask Moscow

Hills of Moscow